Catarrh is an exudate of inflamed mucous membranes in one of the airways or cavities of the body.

Catarrh or catarrhal may also refer to:
 Catarrh, South Carolina, United States, a settlement
 Spring catarrh, a seasonal, warm-weather type of conjunctivitis (pink eye)
 Malignant catarrhal fever, a disease of cattle, sheep and other ruminants
 Catarrhal Noise, an Italian thrash metal band